Hans Carl Johan Wallén (born 19 January 1961) is a Swedish sailor. He won a silver medal in the Star class at the 1996 Summer Olympics with Bobby Lohse. He, together with Lohse, also has a silver medal from the 1993 Star World Championships in Kiel.

References

External links
 
 
 

1961 births
Living people
Swedish male sailors (sport)
Olympic sailors of Sweden
Olympic silver medalists for Sweden
Olympic medalists in sailing
Sailors at the 1992 Summer Olympics – Star
Sailors at the 1996 Summer Olympics – Star
Sailors at the 2000 Summer Olympics – Soling
Medalists at the 1996 Summer Olympics
Europe class world champions
Optimist class world champions
World champions in sailing for Sweden